U.S. Highway 77 (US 77) is the shortest U.S. Highway in the state of Iowa. Like all other state highways in Iowa, the route is maintained by the Iowa Department of Transportation.

US 77 has never been a long route in Iowa.  When it was extended into the state in 1929, it only traveled  in Sioux City before crossing the Big Sioux River into South Dakota.  After I-29 was built in Sioux City during the late 1950s, US 77 was moved onto the new Interstate Highway.  At both historic ends of the highway in Iowa, bridge failures have caused US 77 to be detoured around Sioux City.  In the mid-1980s, the national end of the highway was moved to the interchange with I-29.

Route description

US 77 in Iowa begins on the Siouxland Veterans Memorial Bridge over the Missouri River. It heads north along Wesley Parkway where it comes to an interchange with Interstate 29 (I-29), U.S. Highway 20 Business (US 20 Business), and Iowa Highway 12 (Iowa 12). On either side of the interchange Iowa 12 is an unsigned highway; east of the interchange, the route is signed as US 20 Business, while on the west side it is a duplicate route with I-29. US 20 Business exits Wesley Parkway and briefly overlaps I-29. US 77 ends at the center of the interchange.

US 77 is the shortest U.S. Highway in the state and the second shortest state highway overall. In each instance, the highway crosses the Missouri River from Nebraska and ends at I-29.

History

US 77 has never been a long route in Iowa. It was extended into Iowa in 1929, overlapping US 20 across the Combination Bridge and onto Perry Street. US 20 turned east onto 5th Street and US 77 turned west one block north onto Riverside Avenue, now known as 4th Street. It followed Riverside west and onto a curvy section near the confluence of the Big Sioux and Missouri rivers. The route curved back to the north along the banks of the Big Sioux River. It turned west onto Military Road and crossed the river into South Dakota shortly thereafter. The portion of the route west of US 20 replaced a section of Primary Road No. 141, which followed a route parallel to US 77's.

In 1951, Gordon Drive, which carried US 20 east of the Combination Bridge, was extended westward along the banks of the Missouri River.  It connected to Riverside Avenue near the river confluence.  US 77 was moved onto the new road which removed the curvy section of Riverside.  In the late 1950s when construction of I-29 began, its route was planned along the banks of the Missouri River generally following the path of US 275, US 75, and US 77.  The first section of I-29, from a point along Gordon Drive east of the Combination Bridge to the Big Sioux River opened around October 1, 1958.  US 77 was moved onto the new interstate from the Combination Bridge to the Riverside Boulevard interchange.

After sections of I-29 in South Dakota opened up, allowing traffic to utilize bridges crossing the Big Sioux that were built in 1958, US 77 was moved onto the interstate completely.  However, the arrangement did not last long.  On April 2, 1962, surging flood waters from the Big Sioux brought down the northbound bridge over the river.  An investigation of the collapse found the surging waters scoured the dirt and rocks away from around the bridge piers, which caused them to fail.  Both directions of traffic were routed along US 77's old alignment while the bridges were repaired.

US 77 faced more bridge problems at its other end. In the late-1970s and early-1980s, a steel, tied arch bridge was built to replace the Combination Bridge, which opened in 1895. The Siouxland Veterans Memorial Bridge opened to traffic in January 1981 and was dedicated months later on July 22. This too, would not last long. During routine bridge washing on May 6, 1982, an Iowa DOT worker discovered a  crack across a box girder. The bridge was immediately closed down for repairs. Traffic was rerouted south to cross the Missouri at the I-129 bridge. The bridge would not be fully opened again until May 1983.

Within a couple years, US 77 would be truncated to the I-29 interchange.  The completion of Interstate 29 in South Dakota, which generally followed US 77 northward, meant the end of the U.S. Highway's importance.  Maps published by the Iowa DOT in 1983 and traffic logs from 1984 show and list US 77 extending into South Dakota.  Highway maps and traffic logs from 1986 show US 77 ending at I-29, meaning the route was shortened at some time in those two years.

Major intersections

References

External links

The Iowa Highways Page by Jason Hancock
Pacific Shortline Bridge Collection of photographs and drawings of the Combination Bridge by the Library of Congress

 Iowa
77
Transportation in Woodbury County, Iowa
Sioux City, Iowa